Spectrum Designs Foundation is an autism employment Nonprofit organization in the United States that provides employment to teens and young adults on the Autism Spectrum in a custom apparel shop in Port Washington, NY. It was founded in February 2011 by Patrick Bardsley, Stella Spanakos and Nicole Sugrue, alongside the Nicholas Center (previously Nicholas Center for Autism).

Founded in a barn in co-founder Stella Spanakos' back yard, by 2015 Spectrum had grown an average of 80% year-over-year

Spectrum is prominently featured in the upcoming feature-length documentary from Mesh Omnimedia This Business of Autism. This documentary features prominent figures in the Autism community such as Temple Grandin, Michael S. Bernick, Senator Elaine Phillips and Nassau County DA, Madeline Singas.

Spectrum was mentioned in a 2016 article in Forbes Magazine entitled "Where is Autism Employment headed in 2017?" 

In the Spring of 2018, Spectrum completed the purchase of a 7,400 square foot facility in Port Washington, NY

In the summer of 2018, Spectrum Executives Patrick Bardsley and Tim Howe appeared on Cheddar in their segment entitled How to Help Individuals with Autism Enter the Job Market.

References

Autism-related organizations in the United States
Mental health organizations in New York (state)
2011 establishments in New York (state)